Oregon City station is an Amtrak station in Oregon City, Oregon, United States. The current station consists of a platform and the city's historic Southern Pacific depot that was restored and moved to the site in 2010.

The station is served by Amtrak Cascades Talgo trains originally with two northbound departures in the morning and two southbound departures in the evening. Beginning January 6, 2014, schedules changed to one Portland-Eugene in the morning; one Portland-Eugene in the evening; one morning and one afternoon train each between Eugene and Portland. The Coast Starlight (Seattle – Los Angeles) passes through the station but does not stop.

Ridership at the Oregon City station was 9,165 in 2011. (By comparison, some 330,000 riders boarded and alighted TriMet's 16 daily WES commuter rail trains at the Beaverton Transit Center during the same period).

The 7:24 Amtrak Cascades is a non-stop, 20-minute ride to Portland's Union Station—faster than any TriMet bus or light-rail route offered. The TriMet bus 35 stops near both stations.

References

External links
Oregon City Amtrak Station from City of Oregon City
Amtrak Cascades Schedules
Oregon City, OR (ORC) (Amtrak's Great American Stations)

Buildings and structures in Oregon City, Oregon
Amtrak stations in Oregon
Railway stations in the United States opened in 2004
Railway stations in Clackamas County, Oregon
Former Southern Pacific Railroad stations in Oregon
2004 establishments in Oregon